CBG may refer to:

Finance
 CB Richard Ellis, former NYSE ticker symbol
 Central Bank of The Gambia
 Compagnie des Bauxites de Guinée

Media and culture
 CBG (AM), a CBC Radio One station in Gander, Newfoundland, Canada
 Chongqing Broadcasting Group
 Comic Book Guy, a character on The Simpsons
 Comics Buyer's Guide
 Congressional Baseball Game

Places
 Cambodia, ITU country code
 Cambridge Airport, England (IATA code)
 Cambridge railway station, England (National Rail station code)
 CBG, the herbarium code for the Australian National Botanic Gardens in Canberra

Science
Cannabigerol, a cannabinoid
 CBG Centrum voor familiegeschiedenis, previously Centraal Bureau voor Genealogie, a research centre in The Hague, Netherlands for genealogical and heraldic studies
 Corticosteroid-binding globulin or transcortin, an alpha 2 globulin (protein) in animals